Kate Sheil is an Australian stage and television actress, whose roles include prison officer Janet Conway in the cult television series Prisoner, a role lasting six months in 1981 and 1982. In 1972 she had been a regular cast member of situation comedy series Birds in the Bush.

Other credits include: Cop Shop, Homicide, Sons and Daughters, A Country Practice, Water Rats and All Saints. She had a small role in feature film Puberty Blues (1981) as a school teacher.

Biography
Sheil first appeared in the 1971 television movie What for Mariane? During the next two years, she appeared on the television series Ryan, Boney, Matlock Police and Birds in the Bush. She also had several appearances on Homicide from 1971 to 1976.

In 1975, she made her film debut in  The Golden Cage with Ilhan Kuyululu and Sait Memisoflu. She portrayed Sarah, a young teenager who befriends two newly arrived Turkish immigrants Murat (Ilhan Kuyululu) and Ayhen (Sait Memisoflu). Falling in love with one of them, she eventually leaves him after he demands that she convert to Islam. She is eventually located by the man who proposes to her, however, she refuses despite her being pregnant. Sheil was the only Australian cast in the film.

During 1976, Sheil had a supporting role in the television movie Me & Mr Thorne as well as the television series Alvin Purple and Shannon's Mob. Later that year, she also starred with Tom Oliver and Gerard Maguire in David Williamson's A Handful of Friends at the Russell Street Theatre in Melbourne. She also played a supporting role in The Singer and the Dancer the following year.

In 1980, she appeared on the television series Timelapse, Bellamy and in the television movie Air Hawk before being cast as school teacher Mrs. Velland in the 1981 film Puberty Blues. She also had a guest stint in Prisoner as Janet Conway, a former Wentworth inmate turned prison officer; a storyline which reunited her with Gerard Maguire from Me & Mr Thorne, and saw the two characters in a romantic subplot. After appearing on Sons and Daughters in 1984, she again took a break from acting until the late 1980s appearing in the television mini-series Emma: Queen of the South Seas and Joe Wilson during 1988. After appearing in the 1990 film Weekend with Kate, she also made occasional television appearances in the television movie Heroes II: The Return and, during the late 1990s, guest starred on A Country Practice, Children's Hospital and Water Rats.

Between 2001 and 2005, she played a recurring character, Victoria Carlton, in the soap opera All Saints.

Filmography

FILM

TELEVISION

References

External links
 

Australian film actresses
Australian soap opera actresses
Australian stage actresses
Living people
20th-century Australian actresses
21st-century Australian actresses
Year of birth missing (living people)
Place of birth missing (living people)